Trippe may refer to:

People with the surname
 Gavin Trippe (born 1940), English motorcycle racing promoter, journalist, and publisher
 Leo Trippe (1891–1964), Canadian hardware merchant, farm implement dealer, and political figure
 Juan Trippe (1899–1981), American airline entrepreneur and founder of Pan American Airlines
 John Trippe (1785–1810), officer in the United States Navy during the Quasi-War with France and the First Barbary War
 Robert Pleasant Trippe (1819–1900), American politician, lawyer, and jurist

Other
 USS Trippe, various United States Navy ships
 Trippe Holly Grove Cemetery, near McGhee, Arkansas, USA
 Trippe, Arkansas, city in Desha County, Arkansas with its own junction on Arkansas Highway 159

See also
 
 
 Trip (disambiguation)